Marco Cunico (born 5 March 1978) is an Italian former footballer who played as an attacking midfielder.

After retirement
After Cunico retired in the summer 2016, he became a part of the staff in Padova. He left this role on 19 January 2017, to join AC Lumezzane as a technical director.

Biography

Career

Honours
Portogruaro
 2009–10 Lega Pro Prima Divisione: Champions

Padova
 2014–15 Serie D: Champions

References

External links
 
 Football.it Profile 

1978 births
Living people
Italian footballers
Serie B players
Novara F.C. players
A.C. Carpi players
A.S.D. Portogruaro players
S.P.A.L. players
Calcio Padova players
Association football midfielders
People from Thiene
Sportspeople from the Province of Vicenza
Footballers from Veneto